Falsehood is a 1952 Italian melodrama film directed by Ubaldo Maria Del Colle and starring Yvonne Sanson, Irène Galter and Alberto Farnese. It was shot at the Titanus Studios in Rome. The film's sets were designed by the art director Ottavio Scotti.

Cast
 Yvonne Sanson as  Luisa Sanni
 Irène Galter as Mariella
 Alberto Farnese as Gianni
 Folco Lulli as Rocco
 Mario Ferrari as Padre di Mariella
 Emma Baron as Maddalena
 Enrica Dyrell as Capena
 Tino Carraro as Fabrizio
 Gualtiero Tumiati as Don Clemente
 Enrico Olivieri as Cucciolo
 Carletto Sposito as Brigadiere Oriani
 Virgilio Riento as Brigadiere Sante
 Roberto Murolo as Il pescatore cantante
 Carlo Sposito as Il brigadiere Oriani

References

Bibliography
 Bayman, Louis. The Operatic and the Everyday in Postwar Italian Film Melodrama. Edinburgh University Press, 2014.

External links

1952 films
1952 drama films
Italian drama films
1950s Italian-language films
Films directed by Ubaldo Maria Del Colle
Melodrama films
Italian black-and-white films
1950s Italian films
Titanus films
Films set in Naples